Cellar Door: Terminus ut Exordium is the debut studio album by American hip hop duo The Underachievers. It was released on August 12, 2014 by RPM MSC Distribution.

Production
Producers who contributed in the album includes Frzn Aquarium, Death Tarot, Statik Selektah, Haleek Maul, Ryan Hemsworth, Jordan Dalby, Brandun DeShay, Two Fresh Beats, Supreme Cuts, Lapalux, The Ruby Suns, Nick Leon, Portugal. The Man, and Nick Leon.  The cover art was painted by Pencil Fingerz.

Reception

Critical
Cellar Door: Terminus Ut Exordium was met with generally positive reviews from critics. At Metacritic, which assigns a normalized rating out of 100 to reviews from mainstream critics, the album received an average score of 75, based on 5 reviews, indicating "generally favorable reviews".

Commercial
The album debuted at No. 86 on the Billboard 200, and No. 16 on Top R&B/Hip Hop Albums on the first week of its release.  The album has sold 8,000 copies in the United States as of September 2015.

Track listing

Charts

References

External links

2014 debut albums
Brainfeeder albums
Albums produced by Statik Selektah
The Underachievers albums
Albums produced by Ryan Hemsworth